Mompox Province was the name of different provinces of Colombia.

In 1855 it was a province of the Republic of New Granada.

Later it was a province of Bolívar State (Colombia).

Provinces of the Republic of New Granada